Mikadoroid is a 1991 Japanese science fiction horror film co-produced by Toho, Tohokushinsha, and Tsuburaya Video, and directed by Tomoo Haraguchi. The film was released to Japanese home video on November 8, 1991.

Synopsis
During World War II, the Japanese military established a secret underground laboratory in Tokyo. Three Olympic-level athletes were selected to undergo a process that would turn them into Jinra-go, superhuman armored soldiers. By March 1945, one of the soldiers had been completely transformed into the half-man/half-machine ultimate soldier called Mikadroid. But American B-29s firebomb the city and, while the two super soldiers manage to escape, Mikadroid and the lab are apparently destroyed. 45 years pass, Tokyo is rebuilt, and old secrets are forgotten. The site is now home to a complex that includes the Discoclub Layla. The disco's patrons dance late into the night, unaware that a faulty basement generator has reactivated Mikadroid and the cyborg now prowls the basement levels, killing anyone in its path.

Cast
Yoriko Dōguchi as Saiko
Tomonori Yoshida as Tomita
Hiroshi Atsumi as Okazaki
Takuya Tsuda as Riju
Kenji Hayami as Kitami
Masako Takeda as Noriko
Masatô Ibu as Doctor
Kiyoshi Kurosawa as Military police officer A
Macoto Tezuka as Military police officer C
Hurricane Ryu as Jinra

References

External links
 
Mikadroid review at subtitledonline.com
1991 films
1990s science fiction films
1990s Japanese-language films
Discotek Media
Films scored by Kenji Kawai
Toho films
Tsuburaya Productions
1990s Japanese films